Cryptolestes is a genus of beetles in the family Laemophloeidae. Several species are known as economically important pests of stored products, especially food grains. The four most notorious species are Cryptolestes ferrugineus, Cryptolestes pusilloides, Cryptolestes pusillus, and Cryptolestes turcicus. C. capensis, C. klapperichi, and C. ugandae are less widespread pests.
Species in this genus can be hard to distinguish from one another, and definitive identification often requires close examination of the genitalia.

Species include:

 Cryptolestes abietis Wankowicz
 Cryptolestes ampiyacus Thomas
 Cryptolestes atuloides Lefkovitch
 Cryptolestes atulus Lefkovitch
 Cryptolestes beccarii Grouvelle
 Cryptolestes bicolor Chevrolat
 Cryptolestes biskrensis Grouvelle
 Cryptolestes brunneus Lefkovitch
 Cryptolestes calabozus Thomas
 Cryptolestes candius Lefkovitch
 Cryptolestes capensis Waltl
 Cryptolestes capillulus Thomas
 Cryptolestes cornutus Thomas & Zimmerman
 Cryptolestes corticinus Erichson
 Cryptolestes curus Lefkovitch
 Cryptolestes diemenensis Blackburn
 Cryptolestes divaricatus Grouvelle
 Cryptolestes duplicatus Waltl
 Cryptolestes dybasi Thomas
 Cryptolestes evansi Lefkovitch
 Cryptolestes fauveli Grouvelle
 Cryptolestes ferrugineus Stephens – rusty grain beetle
 Cryptolestes fractipennis Motschulsky
 Cryptolestes fursovi Iablokoff-Khnzorian
 Cryptolestes halevyae Thomas
 Cryptolestes incertus Grouvelle
Cryptolestes inyoensis
 Cryptolestes klapperichi Lefkovitch
 Cryptolestes lepesmei Villiers
 Cryptolestes mexicanus Thomas
 Cryptolestes minimus Lefkovitch
Cryptolestes obesus
 Cryptolestes planulatus Grouvelle
 Cryptolestes pubescens Casey
 Cryptolestes punctatus LeConte
 Cryptolestes pusilloides Steel & Howe
 Cryptolestes pusillus Schonherr – flat grain beetle
Cryptolestes robinclarkei
 Cryptolestes schwarzi Casey
 Cryptolestes spartii Curtis
 Cryptolestes spatulifer Thomas
Cryptolestes spectabilis
 Cryptolestes trinidadensis Thomas
 Cryptolestes turcicus Grouvelle – flour mill beetle
Cryptolestes turnbowi
 Cryptolestes ugandae Steel & Howe
 Cryptolestes uncicornis Reitter
 Cryptolestes weisei Reitter

References

Laemophloeidae
Cucujoidea genera